Kalighat is a locality of Kolkata, in Kolkata district, West Bengal, India. One of the oldest neighbourhoods in South Kolkata, Kalighat is also densely populated — with a history of cultural intermingling with the various foreign incursions into the area over time.

The Kali of Kalighat

The famous temple Kalighat Kali Temple dedicated to the goddess Kali is situated in Kalighat. This is one of the 51 Shakti Peethas. The right toe of Dakshayani Sati is said to have fallen here. The Shakti here is known as Dakshina Kalika, while the Bhairava is Nakulesh. 
Considered one of the Holiest of the Holies in terms of Hindu Shakta Pilgrimage Centres, (Shiva and Durga/Kali/Shakti worshippers) it sees the footfall of thousands of devotees every day. However, Tuesdays and Saturdays are considered very auspicious, and the crowd increases a hundred folds on these two days especially in the evenings.

The special days when the Goddess receives even more pilgrims is during the Vipad Tarini Vrat, and when the Goddess is worshipped as Ratantika and Falaaharini Kali.

Kalika Temple

The Medieval Bhuiyan, Raja Basanta Ray, uncle of Pratapaditya the King of Jessore, (now in Bangladesh) probably built the first Temple here. This temple was situated on the banks of river Adi Ganga. The Temple Complex is laid out in the following manner. The natmandir, a hall attached to the Garbh Griha sanctum sanctorum is in the southern wing while Shiva's temple is situated in the north-eastern wing. There is a temple dedicated to Radha Krishna built in 1843 by a zamindar of Bhaowali.

The Kalighat temple in its present form is only about 200 years old, although it has been referred to in Mansar Bhasan composed in the 15th century, and in Kavi Kankan Mukunda Das Chandi Mangal of the 17th century. Mention of the Kali temple is also found in Lalmohon Bidyanidhis's "Sambanda Nirnoy".

The image of Kali in this temple is unique. It does not follow the pattern of other Kali images in Bengal. The present idol of touchstone was created by two saints -- Atmaram Brahmachari and Brahmananda Giri.

However, the image here is older than what meets the eye. Originally thought to have been worshipped and created by the Hindu All-Father Brahma, there are accounts from antiquity, which say that there was a mound or stupa here, which was called as Brahma'r Dhipi. And the image of the Kali here was present on the Dhipi or the mound, being worshipped regularly. Hundreds of years before Brahmananda GIri and Atmaram Brahmachari even reached this place. 

Presently, the mother goddess has three huge eyes, a long protruding tongue and four hands all of which are made of gold.

The hands of the goddess was originally made out of silver, and had been donated by Gokulchandra Ghoshal, the Diwan of the East India Company, who had been appointed to the post right after the Battle of Plassey. which had been later replaced by gold hands donated by a man named Kalicharan Mullick. The crown on the Devi's head had been donated by Ramnarayan Sarkar of Beleghata. The iconic golden tongue had been donated by Raja Indrachandra Shingho of Paikpara, and the Garland of heads that the goddess wears had been donated by the Maharaja of Patiala.  Nepal's former Army Chief had donated the Umbrella on top of the goddess' head. 

Out of the four hands, the top left hand holds a Kharga or a Scimitar, the bottom left holds a severed head of the Asura King Shumbha, while the top right hand she shows the Abhay Mudra, and the bottom right hands she shows the Varada Mudra.

Whilst the Scimitar signifies Divine Knowledge, the severed head of the Asura signifies the human Ego which has to be slain by the Divine Knowledge to attain Moksha or one's goal in life.

The Abhay Mudra signifies that the Goddess is always there with her devotees, protecting them from harm, while the Varada Mudra shows the benevolence and the soft-heartedness of the Devi, showering her devotees with divine and material blessings.

Kalighat temple has references in 15th century texts. The original temple was a small hut. The present temple was built by the Sabarna Roy Choudhury family of Barisha in 1809. They offered 595 bighas of land to the Temple deity so that worship and service could be continued smoothly. It is believed by some scholars that the name Calcutta was derived from Kalighat. Historically, traders halted at Kalighat to pay patronage to the goddess. The temple was initially on the banks of Hooghly. The river over a period of time has moved away from the temple. The temple is now on the banks of a small canal called Adi Ganga, connecting to Hooghly. The present Dakshina Kali idol of touchstone was created in 1570 CE by two saints - Brahmananda Giri and Atmaram Giri based on the idol of Mata Bhuvaneshwari, the Kuladevi of Sabarna Roy Choudhury family. It was Padmabati Devi, the mother of Laksmikanta Roy Choudhury who discovered the fossils of Sati's finger in a lake called Kalikunda. This made Kalighat as one of the 51 Shakti Pithas.

Panchannagram and Kali-Kshetra
The East India Company obtained from the Mughal emperor Farrukhsiyar, in 1717, the right to rent from 38 villages surrounding their settlement. Of these 5 lay across the Hooghly in what is now Howrah district. The remaining 33 villages were on the Calcutta side. After the fall of Siraj-ud-daulah, the last independent Nawab of Bengal, it purchased these villages in 1758 from Mir Jafar, and reorganised them. These villages were known en-bloc as Dihi Panchannagram and Kalighat was one of them. It was considered to be a suburb beyond the limits of the Maratha Ditch.Cotton, H.E.A., Calcutta Old and New, first published 1909/reprint 1980, pages 103-4 and 221, General Printers and Publishers Pvt. Ltd.
Kalighat was originally called Kali-Kshetra, which is widely accepted as the origin for the word Kalikata, and in turn Calcutta or Kolkata.

The Kalighat Hoard
Some time in 1783, a fisherman found a treasure hoard of more than 200 Gold Coins somewhere near the now defunct Strand on the Adi Ganga, near Kalighat. Not knowing what to do with it, he sold it off to Raja Nabakrishna Deb, Zamindar of Shovabazar-Sutanuti.

Seeing the coins as an opportunity of gaining confidence with the then Governor General of India, Warren Hastings, Nabakrishna Deb gifted him with the coins.

Keeping a few with him, Warren Hastings sent 172 coins from the horde to London, to the East India Company. 

These coins belonged to the Gupta Kings, testaments to India's glorious past, but since no one knew of the Guptas back then (It would not be before another half a century or so that Alexander Cunningham would find out about the glorious age of the Guptas), these coins held little value to the people involved.
 
However, for all practical purposes, the hoard was thought to be lost, as the Company directors sent most of the coins to the melting pot, and some to a few collectors. When Hastings returned to London, he found only 24 of them in the collection of the British Museum. This astonished him beyond measures. He thought he had made a magnificent contribution to the Court of Directors — a hoard of Persian Darics (since no one knew of the Guptas back then).

In 1825, Marsden prepared the Nusmiamata Orientalia, where for the first time they were mentioned as Gupta coins.

The coins had been placed in a brass pot that remained submerged in water for a long time, hence the coins developed an underwater patina of clayish black, owing to the reaction of the gold and the alloys in the coin with the alluvium. 

The hoard contained the Archer Type coins from the reign of Chandragupta II who had probably annexed Bengal to his Empire, and Kumaragupta I with an abundance in coins from the reign of Vishnugupta and Narasimhagupta, besides a few from the times of Shashanka, a later but important Ruler of Gauda.

This is the largest hoard of Gupta coins ever found in the history of India.

The Kalighat Temple as a Shakti Peeth

The Temple at Kalighat is revered as an important Shakti Peetha,  by the Shaktism sect of Hinduism. The mythology of Daksha yajna and Sati's self immolation is the story behind the origin of Shakti Peethas.

Daksha, the son of Brahma was an ancient entity called Prajapati or the keeper of the beings in Hinduism. He had a lot of daughters, one of whom was Sati, an incarnation of the Primordial Mother Goddess or Shakti. She was married to Shiva, the ascetic, whose abode was in the cold and snowy recesses of the Kailasa Parvat. Daksha had frowned upon the marriage, as Shiva was a penniless man, quite unlike the King that Daksha was. In time, Daksha decided that he would arrange a yajna or a ritual where he would invite all the gods, except for Shiva. Sati, his daughter came to her father's place, uninvited and faced a flurry of insults from her father about her husband. Unable to bear the insults, she immolated herself. The news of the death of his beloved wife set Shiva on a delirious rage, as he started the Tandav or the Dance of Destruction with the body of Sati, calming down, only when Vishnu managed to chop her body down into fifty one pieces, which would fall all over the length and breadth of India. (A lot of these places are in modern-day Pakistan and Bangladesh as well.)

Shakti Peethas or divine seats of Shakti or the Primordial Mother Goddess, thus came into being wherever these severed parts of Sati's body had fallen.

Each of the 51 Peethas have a temple dedicated to the Shakti or the Primordial Mother, and a temple dedicated to the Bhairava or Shiva, the All-Father, essentially forming important historical centres to mark the marriage of Shaivism and Shaktism, and also the philosophical fact that a man is nothing without his Shakti or Woman and vice versa.

The Shakti here is thus Dakshina Kali (the benevolent Mother of the World) while the Bhairav being Nakulish or Nakuleshwar.

It is believed that the four TOES from right leg of Sati fell here at KALIGHAT'''. However, some Puranas also mention that the MUKHA KHANDA or the FACE of the Goddess fell here, got fossilized, and is stored and worshipped here.

The 51 Shakti Peethas are linked to the 51 alphabets in Sanskrit, each carrying the power to invoke one of the goddesses associated with them. These Alphabets are called Veej Mantras or the seeds of the primordial sounds of creation. The Veej Mantra for Dakshina Kali is Kring.

The mythological texts which include the Kalika Purana (Asthashakti,) recognize the four major Shakti Peethas -- Bimala where resides the Pada Khanda (feet) (the temple is inside the Jagannath Temple, Puri, Odisha), Tara Tarini housing the Stana Khanda (Breasts), (near Brahmapur, Odisha), Kamakshya, Yoni khanda (vagina) (near Guwahati, Assam) and Dakshina Kalika, Mukha khanda (in Kolkata, West Bengal) originated from the lifeless body of the goddess Sati.

This is illustrated in a hymn from the Kalika Purana (Asthashakti):

"Vimala Pada khandancha,
Stana khandancha Tarini (Tara Tarini),
Kamakhya Yoni khandancha,
Mukha khandancha Kalika (Kali)
Anga pratyanga sangena
Vishnu Chakra Kshate nacha..."

Further explaining the importance of these four Peethas the Brihat Samhita gives the geographical location of these Peethas. For example:
"Rushikulya Tate Devi,
Tarakashya Mahagiri,
Tashya Srunge Stitha Tara,
Vasishta Rajitapara"

Thus, there is no dispute regarding these four Adi Shakti Peethas and their locations. These four Peethas are also believed as the most powerful Shakti Peethas in Bharata Varsha. However, all these Four Adi Shakti Peethas are also part of 51 Shakti Peethas but there are four major parts of Devi Sati's body so they are important, powerful and believed as Adi Shakti Peethas.

Kalika's image
The image of the deity is incomplete. Only the face of the deity was made first. The hands, made of gold and silver, the tongue, the Shiva statue and all the jewellery were added over the years. On snana yatra day, while giving the divine Mother the ceremonial bath, the priests tie their eyes with cloth coverings. On auspicious occasions like Kali Puja, Durga Puja, Poila Boishakh, the Bengali New Year day and sankranti large number of devotees throng the place with offerings.

Adi Ganga
Kalighat was a Ghat (landing stage) sacred to Kali on the old course of the Hooghly river (Bhāgirathi). The name Calcutta is said to have been derived from the word Kalighat. The river over a period of time has moved away from the temple. The temple is now on the banks of a small canal called Adi Ganga which connects to the Hoogly. The Adi Ganga was the original course of the river Hoogly (the Ganges). Hence the name Adi (original) Ganges.

Kalighat painting

Kalighat painting, or pata (originally pronounced 'pot' in Bengali) is a style of Indian painting derives its name from the place. It is characterised by generously curving figures of both men and women and an earthy satirical style. It developed during the nineteenth century in response to the sudden prosperity brought to Calcutta by the East India Company trade, whereby many houses including that of 'Prince' Dwarkanath Tagore, grandfather of Rabindranath Tagore became incredibly wealthy. Many of these nouveau riche families came from not particular exalted caste backgrounds, so the orthodox tended to frown on them and their often very tasteless conspicuous consumption. To the common people the babus, as they were called, were equally objects of fun and sources of income. Thus the 'babu culture' portrayed in the Kalighat patas often shows inversions of the social order (wives beating husbands or leading them about in the guise of pet goats or dogs, maidservants wearing shoes, sahibs in undignified postures, domestic contretemps, and the like.) They also showed European innovations (babus wearing European clothes, smoking pipes, reading at desks, etc.). The object of this is only partly satirical; it also expresses the wonder that ordinary Bengalis felt on exposure to these new and curious ways and objects.

Kalighat pata pictures are highly stylised, do not use perspective, are usually pen and ink line drawings filled in with flat bright colours and normally use paper as a substrate, though some may be found with cloth backing or on cloth. The artists were rarely educated, and usually came from a lineage of artisans. Kalighat patas are still made today although genuine work is hard to come by. The art form is urban and largely secular: although gods and goddesses are often depicted, they appear in much the same de-romanticised way as the humans do. By contrast, the Orissa tradition of pata-painting, centering on Puri, is consciously devotional. Kalighat pata has been credited with influencing the Bengal School of art associated with Jamini Roy.

Kalighat in fiction
Amitav Ghosh's The Calcutta Chromosome is partly set in Kalighat and gives a wonderfully atmospheric depiction of the region as well as the city itself.

Kalighat also plays a prominent role in Song of Kali by Dan Simmons and in the short story Calcutta, Lord of Nerves by Poppy Z. Brite.
It also features in the movie Kahaani starring Vidya Balan and directed by Sujoy Ghosh.

Police district
Kalighat police station is part of the South division of Kolkata Police. Located at 51, Haldarpara Road, Kolkata-700026, it has jurisdiction over the police district which is bordered on the north from the north-east corner of the junction of Sambhu Nath Pandit Street and D. L. Khan Road (old Bhowanipore Road), then eastward by the northern limits of Sambhu Nath Pandit Street to Harish Mukherjee Road, the crossing Harish Mukherjee Road, up to the north-east corner of the junction of Sambhu Nath Pandit Street and Harish Mukherjee Road. 

On the east, from the north-east corner of the junction of Sambhu Nath Pandit Street and Harish Mukherjee Road, then southward by the eastern limits of Harish Mukherjee Road to Hazra Road, then eastward along the northern limits of Hazra Road, then crossing Shyama Prasad Mukherjee Road up to the north-east corner of the junction of Hazra Road and Shyama Prasad Mukherjee Road and then southward along the eastern limits of Shyama Prasad Mukherjee Road up to the north-east corner of the junction of R. B. Avenue and Shyama Prasad Mukherjee Road. 

On the south, from the north-east corner of the junction of Rashbehari Avenue and Shyama Prasad Mukherjee Road (old Russa Road), then crossing Shyama Prasad Mukherjee Road, then west ward by the northern limits of Rashbehari Avenue up to the north-east corner of the junction of Rashbehari Avenue and Tolly's Nullah. 

On the west'', from the north-east corner of the junction of Rashbehari Avenue and Tolly's Nullah, then northwards by the eastern bank of Tolly's Nullah to Rashbehari Avenue, then crossing Rashbehari Avenue, northward along the eastern bank of Tolly's Nullah to the crossing of Tolly's Nullah and D. L. Khan Road (old Bhowanipore Road) and then by the eastern limits of D.L. Khan Road up to the north-east corner of the junction of Sambhu Nath Pandit Street and D. L. Khan Road.

Tollygunge Women's police station has jurisdiction over all the police districts in the South Division, i.e. Park Street, Shakespeare Sarani, Alipore, Hastings, Maidan, Bhowanipore, Kalighat, Tollygunge, Charu Market, New Alipur and Chetla.

Red-light district
Located around the banks of the Adi Ganga canal, an estimated 1,000 to 1,500 prostitutes live and work in the red-light district. Kolkata has emerged as a hub for the trafficking of girls, who often arrive from Nepal, Burma. From Kolkata they are often sold again to brothels in Mumbai (Bombay). Some will go on to the Middle East, Africa and Europe.

See also
 Kalighat Falta Railway
 Kalighat Home for the Dying
 Kalighat River House on the Hawkesbury River near Sydney, Australia

References

Sabarna Prithivi - The Official website of the Sabarna Roy Choudhury Paribar Parishad

External links 

Kolkata(Calcutta) Portal
 Kalighat Narrative
 Kalighat Paintings of West Bengal
 Kalighat Temple Web Site

Neighbourhoods in Kolkata
Tourist attractions in Kolkata
Red-light districts in India